Stuart Fergusson Victor Sutcliffe (23 June 1940 – 10 April 1962) was a Scottish painter and musician best known as the original bass guitarist of the British rock band the Beatles. Sutcliffe left the band to pursue his career as a painter, having previously attended the Liverpool College of Art. Sutcliffe and John Lennon are credited with inventing the name "Beetles" (sic), as they both liked Buddy Holly's band, the Crickets. They also had a fascination of group names with double meanings (as Crickets, for example, the word referring to both an insect as well as a sport), so Lennon then came up with "The Beatles", from the word beat (though Lennon's original spelling was "Beatals"). As a member of the group when it was a five-piece band, Sutcliffe is one of several people sometimes referred to as the "Fifth Beatle".

When he performed with the Beatles in Hamburg, he met photographer Astrid Kirchherr, to whom he was later engaged. After leaving the Beatles, he enrolled in the Hamburg College of Art, studying under future pop artist Eduardo Paolozzi, who later wrote a report stating that Sutcliffe was one of his best students. Sutcliffe earned other praise for his paintings, which mostly explored a style related to abstract expressionism.

While studying in West Germany, Sutcliffe began suffering from intense headaches and experiencing acute light sensitivity. In February 1962, he collapsed in the middle of an art class after complaining of head pains. German doctors performed tests, but were unable to determine what was causing the headaches. After collapsing again on 10 April 1962, he was taken to a hospital, but died in the ambulance on the way there. The cause of death was later found to have been a brain haemorrhage – severe bleeding in the right ventricle of his brain.

Early years
Sutcliffe was the eldest child of Martha (known as Millie; 1907–1983), a schoolteacher at an infants' school and Charles Sutcliffe (25 May 1905 – 18 March 1966) a senior civil servant. Sutcliffe's father had moved to Liverpool to help with wartime work in 1943 and subsequently signed on as a ship's engineer, and so was often at sea during his son's early years. Sutcliffe had two younger sisters, Pauline and Joyce, as well as three older half-brothers, Joe, Ian, and Charles, and an older half-sister, Mattie, from his father's first marriage, to a woman whose name was also Martha.

Sutcliffe was born at the Edinburgh Royal Maternity Hospital and Simpson Memorial Maternity Pavilion in Edinburgh, Scotland, and after his family moved to England, he was brought up at 37 Aigburth Drive in Liverpool. He attended Park View Primary School, Huyton (1946–1951), and Prescot Grammar School from 4 September 1951 to 1956. When Sutcliffe's father returned home on leave, he invited his son and art college classmate Rod Murray (also Sutcliffe's housemate and best friend), for a "real good booze-up", slipping £10 into Sutcliffe's pocket before disappearing for another six months. Beatles' biographer Philip Norman wrote that Charles Sutcliffe was a heavy drinker and physically cruel to his wife, which the young Sutcliffe had witnessed.

During his first year at the Liverpool College of Art, Sutcliffe worked as a bin man on the Liverpool Corporation's waste collection trucks. Lennon was introduced to Sutcliffe by Bill Harry, a mutual friend, when all three were studying at the Liverpool College of Art. According to Lennon, Sutcliffe had a "marvellous art portfolio" and was a very talented painter who was one of the "stars" of the school. He helped Lennon to improve his artistic skills, and with others, worked with him when Lennon had to submit work for exams. 

Sutcliffe shared a flat with Murray at 9 Percy Street, Liverpool, before being evicted and moving to Hillary Mansions at 3 Gambier Terrace, the home of another art student, Margaret Chapman, who vied with Sutcliffe to be the best painter in class. The flat was opposite the new Anglican cathedral in the rundown area of Liverpool 8, with bare lightbulbs and a mattress on the floor in the corner. Lennon moved in with Sutcliffe in early 1960. (Paul McCartney later admitted that he was jealous of Sutcliffe's relationship with Lennon, as he had to take a "back seat" to Sutcliffe.) 

Sutcliffe and his flatmates painted the rooms yellow and black, which their landlady did not appreciate. On another occasion the tenants, needing to keep warm, burned the flat's furniture.

After talking to Sutcliffe one night at the Casbah Coffee Club (owned by Pete Best's mother, Mona Best), Lennon and McCartney persuaded Sutcliffe to buy a Höfner President 500/5 model bass guitar on hire-purchase from Frank Hessey's Music Shop. Sutcliffe's prior musical experience consisted of singing in the local church choir in Huyton (his mother had insisted on piano lessons for him since the age of nine), playing bugle in the Air Training Corps, and his father having taught him some chords on the guitar. 

In May 1960, Sutcliffe joined Lennon, McCartney, and George Harrison (then known as "the Silver Beatles"). Sutcliffe's fingers would often blister during long rehearsals, as he had never practised long enough for his fingers to become calloused, even though he had previously played acoustic guitar. He started acting as a booking agent for the group, and they often used his Gambier Terrace flat as a rehearsal room.

In July 1960, the Sunday newspaper The People ran an article entitled "The Beatnik Horror" that featured a photograph taken in the flat below Sutcliffe's of a teenaged Lennon lying on the floor, with Sutcliffe standing by a window. As they had often visited the Jacaranda club, its owner, Allan Williams, arranged for the photograph to be taken, subsequently taking over from Sutcliffe to book concerts for the group: Lennon, McCartney, Harrison and Sutcliffe. The Beatles' subsequent name change came during an afternoon in the Renshaw Hall bar when Sutcliffe, Lennon, and Lennon's girlfriend, Cynthia Powell, thought up names similar to Holly's band, the Crickets, and came up with Beetles.

The Beatles and Hamburg

Sutcliffe's playing style was elementary, mostly sticking to root notes of chords. Harry—an art school friend and founder and editor of the Mersey Beat newspaper—complained to Sutcliffe that he should be concentrating on art and not music, as he thought that Sutcliffe was a competent musician whose talents would be better used in the visual arts. While Sutcliffe is often described in Beatles' biographies as appearing very uncomfortable onstage and often playing with his back to the audience, their drummer at the time, Best, denies this. He recalls Sutcliffe as being usually good-natured and "animated" before an audience. When the Beatles auditioned for Larry Parnes at the Wyvern Club, Seel Street, Liverpool, Williams later claimed that Parnes would have taken the group as the backing band for Billy Fury for £10 per week, but as Sutcliffe turned his back to Parnes throughout the audition—because, as Williams believed, Sutcliffe could not play very well—Parnes said that he would employ the group only if they got rid of Sutcliffe. Parnes later denied this, stating his only concern was that the group had no permanent drummer. Klaus Voormann regarded Sutcliffe as a good bass player, although Beatles' historian Richie Unterberger described Sutcliffe's bass playing as an "artless thump".

Sutcliffe's profile grew after he began wearing Ray-Ban sunglasses and tight trousers. Sutcliffe's high spot was singing "Love Me Tender", which drew more applause than the other Beatles, and increased the friction between him and McCartney. Lennon also started to criticise Sutcliffe, making jokes about Sutcliffe's size and playing. On 5 December 1960, Harrison was sent back to Britain for being under-age. McCartney and Best were deported for attempted arson at the Bambi Kino, which left Lennon and Sutcliffe in Hamburg. Lennon took a train home, but as Sutcliffe had a cold he stayed in Hamburg. Sutcliffe later borrowed money from his girlfriend, Astrid Kirchherr, in order to fly back to Liverpool on Friday, 20 January 1961, although he returned to Hamburg in March 1961, with the other Beatles.

In July 1961, Sutcliffe decided to leave the group to continue painting. After being awarded a postgraduate scholarship, he enrolled at Hochschule für bildende Künste Hamburg, where he studied under the tutelage of Eduardo Paolozzi. He briefly lent McCartney his bass until the latter could earn enough to buy a specially made smaller left-handed Höfner 500/1 bass guitar of his own in June 1961, but specifically asked McCartney (who is left-handed) not to change the strings around or restring the instrument, so McCartney had to play the bass as it was. In 1967, a photo of Sutcliffe was among those on the cover of the Sgt. Pepper's Lonely Hearts Club Band album (extreme left, in front of fellow artist Aubrey Beardsley).

Astrid Kirchherr

Sutcliffe met Astrid Kirchherr in the Kaiserkeller club, where she had gone to watch the Beatles perform. She had been brought up by her widowed mother, Nielsa Kirchherr, on Eimsbütteler Strasse, in a wealthy part of the Hamburg suburb of Altona. After a photo session with the Beatles, Kirchherr invited them to her mother's house for tea and showed them her bedroom, which she had decorated in black, including the furniture, with silver foil on the walls and a large tree branch hanging from the ceiling. Sutcliffe was smitten and began dating Kirchherr shortly afterwards.

He wrote to friends that he was infatuated with her, and asked her German friends which colours, films, books and painters she liked. Best commented that the beginning of their relationship was "like one of those fairy stories". Kirchherr and Sutcliffe got engaged in November 1960, and exchanged rings, as is the German custom. Sutcliffe later wrote to his parents that he was engaged to Kirchherr, which they were shocked to learn, as they thought he would give up his career as an artist, although he told Kirchherr that he would like to be an art teacher in London or Germany in the future. After moving into the Kirchherr family's house, Sutcliffe used to borrow her clothes. He wore her leather trousers and jackets, collarless jackets, oversized shirts and long scarves, and also borrowed a corduroy suit with no lapels that he wore on stage, which prompted Lennon to sarcastically ask if his mother had lent him the suit.

Art

Sutcliffe displayed artistic talent at an early age. Helen Anderson, a fellow student, remembered his early works as being very aggressive, with dark, moody colours, which was not the type of painting she expected from such a "quiet student". One of Sutcliffe's paintings was shown at the Walker Art Gallery in Liverpool as part of the John Moores exhibition, from November 1959 until January 1960. After the exhibition, Moores bought Sutcliffe's canvas for £65, which was then equal to 6–7 weeks' wages for an average working man. The picture Moores bought was called Summer Painting, and Sutcliffe attended a formal dinner to celebrate the exhibition with another art student, Susan Williams. Murray remembered that the painting was painted on a board, not a canvas, and had to be cut into two pieces (because of its size) and hinged. Murray added that only one of the pieces actually got to the exhibition (because they stopped off in a pub to celebrate), but sold nonetheless because Moores bought it for his son.

Sutcliffe had been turned down when he applied to study for an Art Teachers Diploma (ATD) course at the Liverpool Art College, but after meeting Kirchherr, he decided to leave the Beatles and attend the Hamburg College of Art in June 1961, under the tutelage of Paolozzi, who later wrote a report stating that Sutcliffe was one of his best students. He wrote: "Sutcliffe is very gifted and very intelligent. In the meantime he has become one of my best students."

Sutcliffe's few surviving works reveal influence from the British and European abstract artists contemporary with the Abstract Expressionist movement in the United States. His earlier figurative work is reminiscent of the kitchen sink school, particularly of John Bratby, though Sutcliffe was producing abstract work by the end of the 1950s, including The Summer Painting, purchased by Moores. Sutcliffe's works bear some comparison with those of John Hoyland and Nicolas de Staël, though they are more lyrical (Sutcliffe used the stage name "Stu de Staël" when he was playing with the Beatles on a Scottish tour in spring 1960). His later works are typically untitled, constructed from heavily impastoed slabs of pigment in the manner of de Staël, whom he learned about from Surrey born, art college instructor, Nicky Horsfield, and overlaid with scratched or squeezed linear elements creating enclosed spaces. Hamburg Painting no. 2 was purchased by Liverpool's Walker Art Gallery and is one of a series entitled Hamburg in which the surface and colour changes produced atmospheric energy. European artists (including Paolozzi) were also influencing Sutcliffe at the time. The Walker Art Gallery has other works by Sutcliffe, which are Self-portrait (in charcoal) and The Crucifixion. Lennon later hung a pair of Sutcliffe's paintings in his house (Kenwood) in Weybridge, and McCartney had a Paolozzi sculpture in his Cavendish Avenue home.

Death
While studying in Germany, Sutcliffe began experiencing severe headaches and acute sensitivity to light. According to Kirchherr, some of the headaches left him temporarily blind. In February 1962, Sutcliffe collapsed during an art class in Hamburg. Kirchherr's mother had German doctors examine him, but they were unable to determine the exact cause of his headaches. They suggested he return to the United Kingdom and have himself admitted to a hospital with better facilities; however, after arriving there, Sutcliffe was told nothing was wrong, so he returned to Hamburg. He continued living with the Kirchherrs, but his condition soon worsened. After he collapsed again on 10 April 1962, Kirchherr took him to hospital, riding with him in the ambulance, but he died before they arrived. The cause of death was brain haemorrhage, specifically a ruptured aneurysm resulting in cerebral paralysis due to severe bleeding into the right ventricle of the brain. He was 21 years old.

On 13 April 1962, Kirchherr met the group at Hamburg Airport, telling them that Sutcliffe had died a few days earlier. Sutcliffe's mother flew to Hamburg with Beatles manager Brian Epstein and returned to Liverpool with her son's body. Sutcliffe's father did not hear of Stuart's death for three weeks, as he was sailing to South America on a cruise ship, although the family arranged for a padre, a military chaplain, to give him the news as soon as the ship docked in Buenos Aires. After Sutcliffe's death, Kirchherr wrote a letter to his mother, apologizing for being too ill to attend his funeral in Liverpool and saying how much she and Lennon missed him:
Oh, Mum, he (Lennon) is in a terrible mood now, he just can't believe that darling Stuart never comes back. [He's] just crying his eyes out ... John is marvellous to me, he says that he knows Stuart so much and he loves him so much that he can understand me.
The cause of Sutcliffe's aneurysm is unknown, although authors of books on the Beatles have speculated that it was caused by an earlier head injury. He may have been either kicked in the head, or thrown, head first, against a brick wall during an attack outside Lathom Hall, after a performance in January 1961. According to booking agent Allan Williams, Lennon and Best went to Sutcliffe's aid, fighting off his attackers before dragging him to safety. Sutcliffe sustained a fractured skull in the fight and Lennon's little finger was broken. Sutcliffe refused medical attention at the time and failed to keep an X-ray appointment at Sefton General Hospital.

Although Lennon did not attend nor send flowers to Sutcliffe's funeral, his second wife, Yoko Ono, remembered that Lennon mentioned Sutcliffe's name very often, saying that he was "[My] alter ego ... a spirit in his world ... a guiding force".

Posthumous music releases
The Beatles' compilation album Anthology 1, released in 1995, featured previously unreleased recordings from the group's early years. Sutcliffe plays bass with the Beatles on three songs they recorded in 1960: "Hallelujah, I Love Her So", "You'll Be Mine", and "Cayenne". In addition, he is pictured on the front covers of all three Anthology albums.

In 2011, Sutcliffe's estate released a recording claimed to be Sutcliffe singing a cover of Elvis Presley's "Love Me Tender", recorded in 1961 and donated to the estate in 2009. The cover art shows a Sutcliffe painting entitled Homage to Elvis. The recording was quickly proven to be fake by amateurs and industry professionals alike; it was clearly an amateur 'pitch shift' edit of the 1967 recording of "Love Me Tender" by The Boston Show Band (later known as the Glittermen).

Film, television, and books
Part One of The Beatles Anthology video documentary covers Sutcliffe's time with the group. There is no mention of his death in the documentary, but it is discussed in the accompanying book.

Sutcliffe was portrayed by David Nicholas Wilkinson in the film Birth of the Beatles (1979) and by Lee Williams in In His Life: The John Lennon Story (2000). Sutcliffe's role in the Beatles' early career, as well as the factors that led him to leave the group, is dramatised in the 1994 film Backbeat, in which he was portrayed by American actor Stephen Dorff. Sutcliffe does not appear in the 2009 film Nowhere Boy, but is briefly mentioned toward the end of the film.
Four television documentaries have been broadcast that deal with Sutcliffe's life:
Midnight Angel (1990) Granada TV (networked) U.K.
Exhibition (1991) Cologne, German TV
Stuart, His life and Art (2005) BBC
Stuart Sutcliffe, The Lost Beatle

Books about Sutcliffe:

 Backbeat: Stuart Sutcliffe: The Lost Beatle (1994) Alan Clayson and Pauline Sutcliffe 
 Stuart, The Life and Art of Stuart Sutcliffe (1995) Pauline Sutcliffe and Kay Williams 
 The Beatles Shadow, Stuart Sutcliffe, & His Lonely Hearts Club (2001) Pauline Sutcliffe and Douglas Thompson
 Stuart Sutcliffe: a retrospective (2008) Matthew H. Clough and Colin Fallows 
 Baby's in Black (2010) Arne Bellstorf - graphic novel

The Stuart Sutcliffe Estate sells memorabilia and artifacts of Sutcliffe's, which include poems written by him and the chords and lyrics to songs Lennon and Sutcliffe were learning.

Notes

References

External links

Stuart Sutcliffe and The Beatles exhibition at the Museum of Liverpool Life
Stuart – The Life and Art of Stuart Sutcliffe
Stuart quote about the Romeos: Lennon, McCartney and Harrison 
A summary of Sutcliffe's last year of life in Germany from the book Komm, Gib Mir Deine Hand
Buried in Huyton Parish Church Cemetery

Partial letter from John Lennon to Stuart Sutcliffe at the British Library
 
 

The Beatles members
Musicians from Edinburgh
People from Huyton
20th-century English painters
English male painters
English rock bass guitarists
Male bass guitarists
1940 births
1962 deaths
20th-century Scottish painters
Scottish male painters
Alumni of Liverpool College of Art
Scottish bass guitarists
Scottish contemporary artists
English contemporary artists
English people of Scottish descent
Anglo-Scots
Scottish expatriates in Germany
20th-century Scottish male musicians
20th-century bass guitarists
People educated at Prescot Grammar School
20th-century English male musicians
Artists from Edinburgh
Deaths from intracranial aneurysm